The Voice of Palestine is a radio station based in Ramallah. It is a subsidiary of the Palestinian Broadcasting Corporation, under the control of the Palestinian Authority. The station was originally known as the Voice of Palestinian Revolution before the 1993 Oslo Accords, and was launched on 17 October 1998. The first experimental transmissions included music programs, songs and news bulletins in addition to health, culture, and sports programs.

On 12 October 2000 – shortly after the outbreak of the Second Intifada – successive Israeli Air Force raids stopped transmission of the Voice of Palestine, destroying the technical equipment used for transmission. Currently the radio service broadcasts on shortwave (AM).

See also
 Palestinian Broadcasting Corporation
 Palestinian Satellite Channel

References

External links
 Palestinian Broadcasting Corporation website
 List of Palestinian Media
 Listen to Voice of Palestine

Multinational companies
Publicly funded broadcasters
Radio stations in the State of Palestine
Mass media in the State of Palestine
Arab mass media
Mass media in Ramallah
State media